This is a list of 545 species in Pityophthorus, a genus of typical bark beetles in the family Curculionidae.

Pityophthorus species

 Pityophthorus abbreviatus Schedl, 1972g c
 Pityophthorus abiegnus Wood, 1964 c
 Pityophthorus abietinus Wood, 1989 c
 Pityophthorus abietis Blackman, 1928b c
 Pityophthorus ablusus Bright, 1985b c
 Pityophthorus abnormalis Bright, 1972d c
 Pityophthorus absonus Blackman, 1928 i c
 Pityophthorus abstrusus Bright, 1976c c
 Pityophthorus acceptus Bright, 1981d c
 Pityophthorus acerini Blackman, 1928b c
 Pityophthorus aciculatus Bright, 1977 c
 Pityophthorus acuminatus Bright, 1981d c
 Pityophthorus acutus Blackman, 1928 i c
 Pityophthorus africanulus Wood, 1992a c
 Pityophthorus africanus Eggers, 1927a c
 Pityophthorus agnatus Blackman, 1928b c
 Pityophthorus albertensis Blackman, 1928b c
 Pityophthorus alienus Eichhoff, 1872a c
 Pityophthorus alni Blackman, 1942a c
 Pityophthorus alnicolens Wood, 1977b c
 Pityophthorus alpinensis Hopping, 1960 i c
 Pityophthorus alvarengai Schedl, 1972g c
 Pityophthorus amiculus Wood, 1975b c
 Pityophthorus amoenus Blandford, 1904 c
 Pityophthorus amplus (Blackman, 1928) i c
 Pityophthorus anacardii Wood, 2007 c
 Pityophthorus anceps Blackman, 1928b c
 Pityophthorus angeri Pfeffer, 1927 c
 Pityophthorus angustus Blackman, 1928b c
 Pityophthorus annectens LeConte, 1878 i c b
 Pityophthorus anthracinus Bright, 1976c c
 Pityophthorus anticus Schedl, 1976a c
 Pityophthorus antillicus Bright, 1981c c
 Pityophthorus antiquarius Bright & Poinar, 1994 c
 Pityophthorus apachae Bright, 1977 c
 Pityophthorus apache Bright, 1977 i g
 Pityophthorus aphelofacies Bright & Poinar, 1994 c
 Pityophthorus apicenotatus Schedl, 1976a c
 Pityophthorus apicipennis Schedl, 1976a c
 Pityophthorus apiculatus Schedl, 1937h c
 Pityophthorus aplanatus Schedl, 1930 c
 Pityophthorus aquilonius Bright, 1968c c
 Pityophthorus aquilus Blackman, 1928 i c
 Pityophthorus arakii Bright, 1977 c
 Pityophthorus arcanus Bright, 1976 i c
 Pityophthorus arceuthobii Wood, 1971 c
 Pityophthorus argentinensis Eggers, 1951 c
 Pityophthorus argentiniae Wood & Bright, 1992 c
 Pityophthorus aristatae Bright, 1964 c
 Pityophthorus artifex Blackman, 1928b c
 Pityophthorus ascendens Schedl, 1972g c
 Pityophthorus ashanti Schedl, 1972e c
 Pityophthorus assitus Wood, 1977b c
 Pityophthorus aterrimus Eggers, 1931b c
 Pityophthorus atkinsoni Bright, 1985a c
 Pityophthorus atomus Wood, 1964 c
 Pityophthorus atratulus LeConte, 1868 c
 Pityophthorus attenuatus Blackman, 1942a c
 Pityophthorus auctor Blackman, 1942a c
 Pityophthorus aurulentus Bright, 1966b c
 Pityophthorus australis Blackman, 1928b c
 Pityophthorus aztecus Bright, 1977 c
 Pityophthorus bahiae Wood, 2007 c
 Pityophthorus balcanicus Pfeffer, 1940b c
 Pityophthorus balsameus Blackman, 1922 i c
 Pityophthorus barberi Blackman, 1928 i c
 Pityophthorus barbifer Schedl, 1964j c
 Pityophthorus barbosai Wood, 2007 c
 Pityophthorus bassetti Blackman, 1920 i c
 Pityophthorus bellus Blackman, 1928b c
 Pityophthorus bibractensis Balachowsky, 1949a c
 Pityophthorus biovalis Blackman, 1922 i c
 Pityophthorus bisulcatus Eichhoff, 1869a c
 Pityophthorus blackmani Wood, 1986a c
 Pityophthorus blandulus Schedl, 1955g c
 Pityophthorus blandus Blackman, 1928 i c
 Pityophthorus bolivianus Eggers, 1943a c
 Pityophthorus borrhichiae Wood, 1964 i
 Pityophthorus borrichiae Wood, 1964 c
 Pityophthorus boycei Swaine, 1925 i c
 Pityophthorus brasiliensis Wood & Bright, 1992 c
 Pityophthorus bravoi Bright, 1986b c
 Pityophthorus brevicomatus Bright, 1976c c
 Pityophthorus brevis Blackman, 1928 i c
 Pityophthorus brevisetosus Eggers, 1933b c
 Pityophthorus brighti Wood, 1989 c
 Pityophthorus briscoei Blackman, 1922 i c
 Pityophthorus brucki Bright, 1971b c
 Pityophthorus burkei Blackman, 1928b c
 Pityophthorus burserae Wood, 1976a c
 Pityophthorus busseae Schedl, 1962h c
 Pityophthorus buyssoni Reitter, 1901a c
 Pityophthorus cacuminatus Blandford, 1904 c
 Pityophthorus caelator Blackman, 1928b c
 Pityophthorus californicus Bright, 1976 i c
 Pityophthorus camerunus Eggers, 1920 c
 Pityophthorus canadensis Swaine, J.M., 1917 c
 Pityophthorus carinatus Bright, 1978 i c
 Pityophthorus cariniceps LeConte, 1876 i c
 Pityophthorus carinifrons Blandford, 1904 c
 Pityophthorus carinulatus Swaine, 1925 i c
 Pityophthorus carmeli Swaine, 1918 i c
 Pityophthorus carniolicus Wichmann, H.E., 1910a c
 Pityophthorus cascoensis Blackman, 1928 i c
 Pityophthorus catulus Blackman, 1928b c
 Pityophthorus cavatus Bright, 1978 i c
 Pityophthorus cedri Wood, 1989 c
 Pityophthorus celatus Wood & Bright, 1992 c
 Pityophthorus cephalonicae Pfeffer, 1940b c
 Pityophthorus chalcoensis Hopkins, 1905b c
 Pityophthorus chiapensis Bright, 1977 c
 Pityophthorus chilgoza Wood, 1989 c
 Pityophthorus chir Beeson, 1961 c
 Pityophthorus ciliatus Blackman, 1942a c
 Pityophthorus cincinnatus Blandford, 1904 c
 Pityophthorus citus Blackman, 1928b c
 Pityophthorus clarus Blackman, 1928 i c
 Pityophthorus clivus Bright, 1977 c
 Pityophthorus cognatus Blackman, 1928b c
 Pityophthorus collaris Schedl, 1965c c
 Pityophthorus collinus Bright, 1968c c
 Pityophthorus comosus Blackman, 1928 i c
 Pityophthorus comptus Blackman, 1928b c
 Pityophthorus concavus Blackman, 1928 i c
 Pityophthorus concentralis Eichhoff, 1878 i c
 Pityophthorus concinnus Wood, 1977b c
 Pityophthorus confertus Swaine, 1917 i c
 Pityophthorus confinis LeConte, 1876 i c
 Pityophthorus confractus Bright, 1985c c
 Pityophthorus confusus Blandford, 1904 i c
 Pityophthorus congonus Eggers, 1927a c
 Pityophthorus coniferae Stebbing, E.P., 1909b c
 Pityophthorus coniperda Schwarz, E.A., 1895a c
 Pityophthorus conscriptus Bright, 1986b c
 Pityophthorus consimilis LeConte, 1878 i c b
 Pityophthorus conspectus Wood, 1976a c
 Pityophthorus convexicollis Bright & Torres, 2006 c
 Pityophthorus coronarius Blackman, 1942a c
 Pityophthorus corruptus Wood, 1976a c
 Pityophthorus cortezi Bright, 1977 c
 Pityophthorus corticalis Eichhoff, 1872a c
 Pityophthorus costabilis Wood, 1976a c
 Pityophthorus costalimai Blackman, 1942a c
 Pityophthorus costatulus Wood, 1976a c
 Pityophthorus costatus Wood, 1975b c
 Pityophthorus costifera Bright, 1985b c
 Pityophthorus cracentis Bright, 1985b c
 Pityophthorus crassus Blackman, 1928 i c
 Pityophthorus cribratus Pfeffer, 1940b c
 Pityophthorus cribripennis Eichhoff, 1869a c
 Pityophthorus crinalis Blackman, 1928 i c
 Pityophthorus cristatus Wood, 1964 i c
 Pityophthorus crotonis Wood, 1977d c
 Pityophthorus cubensis Schedl, 1972g c
 Pityophthorus culminicolae Bright, 1977 c
 Pityophthorus curtulus Sokanovskii, B.V., 1954 c
 Pityophthorus cuspidatus Blackman, 1942a c
 Pityophthorus cutleri Swaine, J.M., 1925b c
 Pityophthorus debilis Wood, 1976a c
 Pityophthorus declivisetosus Bright, 1977 c
 Pityophthorus degener Wood, 1975b c
 Pityophthorus deleoni Bright, 1976c c
 Pityophthorus deletus LeConte, 1879 i c
 Pityophthorus delicatus Wood, 1978b c
 Pityophthorus demissus Blackman, 1928b c
 Pityophthorus denticulatus Wood & Bright, 1992 c
 Pityophthorus dentifrons Blackman, 1922 i c
 Pityophthorus deodara Wood & Bright, 1992 c
 Pityophthorus deprecator Schaufuss, C.F.C., 1891 c
 Pityophthorus depygis Blackman, 1928 i c
 Pityophthorus desultorius Bright, 1985b c
 Pityophthorus detectus Schedl, 1972g c
 Pityophthorus detentus Wood, 1976a c
 Pityophthorus deyrollei Blandford, 1904 c
 Pityophthorus digestus (LeConte, 1874) i c
 Pityophthorus diglyphus Blandford, 1904 c
 Pityophthorus diligens Wood, 1976a c
 Pityophthorus dimidiatus Blackman, 1942a c
 Pityophthorus diminutivus Bright, 1985a c
 Pityophthorus dimorphus Schedl, 1959m c
 Pityophthorus discretus Wood, 1977c c
 Pityophthorus dispar Bright, 1976c c
 Pityophthorus dissolutus Wood, 1975b c
 Pityophthorus diversus Bright, 1972d c
 Pityophthorus djuguensis Eggers, 1940b c
 Pityophthorus dolus Wood, 1964 c
 Pityophthorus dorsalis Schedl, 1953d c
 Pityophthorus durus Blackman, 1928 i c
 Pityophthorus edulis Blackman, 1928b c
 Pityophthorus eggersi Schedl, 1952d c
 Pityophthorus eggersianus Schedl, 1958k c
 Pityophthorus elatinus Wood, 1964 c
 Pityophthorus electus Blackman, 1928 i c
 Pityophthorus elegans Schedl, 1938a c
 Pityophthorus elimatus Bright, 1976c c
 Pityophthorus elongatulus Schedl, 1976a c
 Pityophthorus elongatus Swaine, J.M., 1925b c
 Pityophthorus epistomalis Schedl, 1961i c
 Pityophthorus equihuai Bright, 1985a c
 Pityophthorus erraticus Schedl, 1976a c
 Pityophthorus espinosai Brèthes, 1925 c
 Pityophthorus eucracens Wood, 2007 c
 Pityophthorus euterpes Bright, 1978 c
 Pityophthorus excellens Schedl, 1972g c
 Pityophthorus exiguus Blackman, 1928b c
 Pityophthorus exilis Swaine, J.M., 1925b c
 Pityophthorus eximius Schedl, 1938a c
 Pityophthorus explicitus Wood, 1975b c
 Pityophthorus exquisitus Bright, 1981d c
 Pityophthorus exsculptus Eichhoff, 1864b c
 Pityophthorus exsectus Schedl, 1972g c
 Pityophthorus fallax Wood & Bright, 1992 c
 Pityophthorus fennicus Eggers, 1914 c
 Pityophthorus festus Wood, 1967 i c
 Pityophthorus flavimaculatus Murayama, 1963c c
 Pityophthorus foratus Wood, 1967d c
 Pityophthorus formosus Bright, 1972d c
 Pityophthorus fortis Blackman, 1928b c
 Pityophthorus fossifrons Leconte, 1876 c
 Pityophthorus franseriae Wood, 1971 i c
 Pityophthorus frontalis Wood & Bright, 1992 c
 Pityophthorus fulgens Schedl, 1965c c
 Pityophthorus furnissi Bright, 1976c c
 Pityophthorus fuscus Blackman, 1928 i c
 Pityophthorus galeritus Wood, 1976a c
 Pityophthorus gentilis Schedl, 1961i c
 Pityophthorus germanus Bright, 1976c c
 Pityophthorus ghanaensis Schedl, 1972k c
 Pityophthorus glaber Schedl (Eggers in), 1951m c
 Pityophthorus glabratulus Bright, 1976b c
 Pityophthorus glabratus Eichhoff, 1878b c
 Pityophthorus glutae Wood, 1989 c
 Pityophthorus gracilis Swaine, J.M., 1925b c
 Pityophthorus grandis Blackman, 1928 i c
 Pityophthorus granulatus Swaine, J.M., 1917 c
 Pityophthorus granulicauda Schedl, 1979c c
 Pityophthorus granulipennis Schedl, 1966f c
 Pityophthorus guadeloupensis Nunberg, 1956d c
 Pityophthorus guatemalensis Blandford, 1904 c
 Pityophthorus gunneri Schedl, 1970f c
 Pityophthorus hamamelidis Blackman, 1928b c
 Pityophthorus henscheli Seitner, M., 1887 c
 Pityophthorus hermosus Wood, 1976a c
 Pityophthorus herrarai Hopkins, 1905b c
 Pityophthorus hesperius Bright, 1978 c
 Pityophthorus hidalgoensis Blackman, 1942a c
 Pityophthorus hintzi Schedl, 1938h c
 Pityophthorus hirticeps LeConte, 1878b c
 Pityophthorus hispaniolus Bright, 1985c c
 Pityophthorus hopkinsi Blackman, 1928b c
 Pityophthorus hubbardi Blackman, 1928b c
 Pityophthorus hylocuroides Wood, 1964 c
 Pityophthorus icicae Wood, 2007 c
 Pityophthorus idoneus Blackman, 1928b c
 Pityophthorus ignotus Schedl, 1961e c
 Pityophthorus ikelaensis Nunberg, 1967b c
 Pityophthorus imbellis Wood, 2007 c
 Pityophthorus immanis Blackman, 1928 i c
 Pityophthorus impexus Bright, 1978 c
 Pityophthorus inaequidens Schedl, 1976a c
 Pityophthorus inceptis Wood, 1975b c
 Pityophthorus incommodus Blandford, 1904 c
 Pityophthorus incompositus Blandford, 1904 c
 Pityophthorus indefessus Bright, 1986a c
 Pityophthorus indigens Wood, 1976a c
 Pityophthorus indigus Wood, 1978 i c
 Pityophthorus ineditus Bright, 1976c c
 Pityophthorus infans Eichhoff, 1872a c
 Pityophthorus infimus Schedl, 1972g c
 Pityophthorus infulatus Blackman, 1928 i c
 Pityophthorus ingens Blackman, 1928 i c
 Pityophthorus inhabilis Bright, 1986a c
 Pityophthorus iniquus Blackman, 1928b c
 Pityophthorus inops Wood, 1976a c
 Pityophthorus inquietus Blackman, 1928b c
 Pityophthorus insuetus Bright, 1985b c
 Pityophthorus intentus Bright, 1978 i c
 Pityophthorus intextus Swaine, 1917 i c
 Pityophthorus inyoensis Bright, 1971b c
 Pityophthorus irregularis Eggers, 1931b c
 Pityophthorus irritans Schedl, 1979j c
 Pityophthorus islasi Wood, 1962 c
 Pityophthorus ituriensis Eggers, 1940b c
 Pityophthorus jeffreyi Blackman, 1928 i c
 Pityophthorus joveri Schedl, 1954d c
 Pityophthorus jucundus Blandford, 1894d c
 Pityophthorus juglandis Blackman, 1928 i c b  (walnut twig beetle)
 Pityophthorus keeni (Blackman, 1928) i
 Pityophthorus kenti Blackman, 1928b c
 Pityophthorus kenyae Schedl, 1955i c
 Pityophthorus kirgisicus Pjatnitskii, 1931 c
 Pityophthorus kivuensis Schedl, 1957d c
 Pityophthorus knoteki Reitter, 1898b c
 Pityophthorus kurentzovi Krivolutskaya, 1996a c
 Pityophthorus kuscheli Schedl, 1951d c
 Pityophthorus laetus Wood, 1976a c
 Pityophthorus laevigatus Eggers, 1933b c
 Pityophthorus languidus Eichhoff, 1878b c
 Pityophthorus lapponicus Stark, V.N., 1952 c
 Pityophthorus lateralis Swaine, J.M., 1917 c
 Pityophthorus laticeps Bright, 1978 c
 Pityophthorus lautus Eichhoff, 1872 i c
 Pityophthorus lecontei Bright, 1977 i c
 Pityophthorus leechi Wood, 1977 i c
 Pityophthorus leiophyllae Blackman, 1942a c
 Pityophthorus lenis Wood, 1976a c
 Pityophthorus lepidus Bright, 1977 c
 Pityophthorus levis Wood, 1986 i c
 Pityophthorus lichtensteini Eichhoff, 1864b c
 Pityophthorus limatus Wood, 1964 c
 Pityophthorus liquidambarus Blackman, 1921 i c
 Pityophthorus litos Bright, 1976c c
 Pityophthorus longipilus Schedl, 1951m c
 Pityophthorus longulus Sokanovskii, B.V., 1954 c
 Pityophthorus macrographus Eichhoff, 1880a c
 Pityophthorus madagascariensis Schedl, 1951j c
 Pityophthorus malleatus Bright, 1978 c
 Pityophthorus mandibularis Schedl, 1951m c
 Pityophthorus maritimus Stark, V.N., 1952 c
 Pityophthorus maroantsetrae Schedl, 1965c c
 Pityophthorus mauretanicus Peyerimhoff, 1930 c
 Pityophthorus medialis Wood, 1976a c
 Pityophthorus megas Bright, 1976c c
 Pityophthorus melanurus Wood, 1976a c
 Pityophthorus mendosus Wood, 1975b c
 Pityophthorus mesembria Bright, 1978 c
 Pityophthorus mexicanus Blackman, 1928b c
 Pityophthorus micans Bright, 1981d c
 Pityophthorus micrographus (Linnaeus, C., 1758) c g
 Pityophthorus micrograptinus Wood, 1989 c
 Pityophthorus miniatus Bright, 1981d c
 Pityophthorus minimus Bright, 1976 i c g
 Pityophthorus minus Bright, 1976c c
 Pityophthorus minutalis Wood, 1976a c
 Pityophthorus minutus Schedl, 1963d c
 Pityophthorus modicus Blackman, 1928 i c
 Pityophthorus molestus Wood, 1976a c
 Pityophthorus mollis Blackman, 1928b c
 Pityophthorus monophyllae Blackman, 1928b c
 Pityophthorus montezumae Bright, 1978 c
 Pityophthorus monticolae Bright, 1978 c
 Pityophthorus montivagus Bright, 1977 c
 Pityophthorus moritzi Wood, 2007 c
 Pityophthorus mormon Bright, 1977 i c
 Pityophthorus morosovi Spessivtsev, P., 1926b c
 Pityophthorus morosus Wood, 1976a c
 Pityophthorus mpossae Schedl, 1957d c
 Pityophthorus muluensis Bright, 2000 c
 Pityophthorus mulungensis Schedl, 1957d c
 Pityophthorus mundus Blackman, 1928b c
 Pityophthorus murrayanae Blackman, 1922 i c
 Pityophthorus nanus Wood, 1964 c
 Pityophthorus natalis Blackman, 1921 c
 Pityophthorus navus Blackman, 1928b c
 Pityophthorus nebulosus Wood, 1976a c
 Pityophthorus nectandrae Wood, 2007 c
 Pityophthorus nemoralis Wood, 1976a c
 Pityophthorus niger Schedl, 1938a c
 Pityophthorus nigricans Blandford, 1904 c
 Pityophthorus nigriceps Wood, 2007 c
 Pityophthorus nitellus Browne, 1973a c
 Pityophthorus nitidicollis Blackman, 1928b c
 Pityophthorus nitidulus (Mannerheim, 1843) i
 Pityophthorus nitidus Swaine, 1917 i c
 Pityophthorus nocturnus Schedl, 1938a c
 Pityophthorus novateutonicus Schedl, 1964b c
 Pityophthorus novellus Blackman, 1928 i c
 Pityophthorus nudus Swaine, J.M., 1917 c
 Pityophthorus nugalis Wood, 1976a c
 Pityophthorus obliquus LeConte, 1878a c
 Pityophthorus obsoletus Blandford, 1904 c
 Pityophthorus obtusipennis Blandford, 1904 c
 Pityophthorus obtusus Schaufuss, C.F.C., 1891 c
 Pityophthorus occidentalis Blackman, 1920 i c
 Pityophthorus occlusus Bright, 1976c c
 Pityophthorus olivierai Schedl, 1972g c
 Pityophthorus opacifrons Wood, 2007 c
 Pityophthorus opaculus LeConte, 1878 i c
 Pityophthorus opimus Blackman, 1928b c
 Pityophthorus orarius Bright, 1968 i c
 Pityophthorus ornatus Blackman, 1928b c
 Pityophthorus ostryacolens Bright, 1986b c
 Pityophthorus pampasae Schedl, 1970e c
 Pityophthorus parfentievi Pjatnitskii, 1931 c
 Pityophthorus parilis Wood, 1976a c
 Pityophthorus patchi Blackman, 1922c c
 Pityophthorus paulus Wood, 1964 c
 Pityophthorus pecki Atkinson, 1993b c
 Pityophthorus pellitus Schedl, 1955g c
 Pityophthorus pentaclethrae Schedl, 1957d c
 Pityophthorus peregrinus Eichhoff, 1878b c
 Pityophthorus perexiguus Wood, 1976a c
 Pityophthorus perotei Blackman, 1942a c
 Pityophthorus philippinensis Schedl, 1936h c
 Pityophthorus piceae Blackman, 1928b c
 Pityophthorus piceus Bright, 1966b c
 Pityophthorus pilifer Schedl, 1931b c
 Pityophthorus pinavorus Bright, 1985 i c
 Pityophthorus pindrow Beeson, 1961 c
 Pityophthorus pinguus (Blackman, 1928) i g
 Pityophthorus pini Kurenzov, 1941a c
 Pityophthorus pinsapo Pfeffer, 1982b c
 Pityophthorus podocarpi Wood, 2007 c
 Pityophthorus politus Blandford, 1904 c
 Pityophthorus polonicus Karpinski, 1949 c
 Pityophthorus ponderosae Blackman, 1928b c
 Pityophthorus poricollis Blandford, 1904 c
 Pityophthorus praealtus Bright, 1966b c
 Pityophthorus pruinosus Eichhoff, 1878b c
 Pityophthorus pseudotsugae Swaine, 1918 i g
 Pityophthorus puberulus (LeConte, 1868) i
 Pityophthorus pubifrons Bright, 1981d c
 Pityophthorus pudicus Blackman, 1942a c
 Pityophthorus pulchellus Eichhoff, 1869 i c
 Pityophthorus pulicarius (Zimmermann, 1868) i
 Pityophthorus pullus (Zimmermann, 1868) i
 Pityophthorus punctatus Eggers, 1940a c
 Pityophthorus puncticollis LeConte, 1874a c
 Pityophthorus punctifrons Bright, 1966 i c
 Pityophthorus punctiger Wood & Bright, 1992 c
 Pityophthorus pusillus Wood, 1964 c
 Pityophthorus pusio LeConte, 1878b c
 Pityophthorus pygmaeolus Schedl, 1970e c
 Pityophthorus pygmaeus Schedl, 1931b c
 Pityophthorus quadrispinatus Schedl, 1966f c
 Pityophthorus quercinus Wood, 1967d c
 Pityophthorus querciperda Schwarz, E.A., 1888a c
 Pityophthorus ramiperda Swaine, 1917 i c
 Pityophthorus ramulorum Perris, 1856a c
 Pityophthorus recens Bright, 1977 i g
 Pityophthorus regularis Blackman, 1942a c
 Pityophthorus repens Bright, 1976c c
 Pityophthorus reticulatus Wood, 2007 c
 Pityophthorus retifrons Wood, 2007 c
 Pityophthorus rhois Swaine, J.M., 1917 c
 Pityophthorus robai Wood, 1977b c
 Pityophthorus robustus Pfeffer, 1940b c
 Pityophthorus roppae Schedl, 1976a c
 Pityophthorus rossicus Eggers, 1915b c
 Pityophthorus rubidus Wood, 1978 i c
 Pityophthorus rubripes Eggers, 1943a c
 Pityophthorus rudis Blackman, 1942a c
 Pityophthorus rugicollis Swaine, J.M., 1925b c
 Pityophthorus sachalinensis Krivolutskaya, 1956 c
 Pityophthorus sambuci Blackman, 1942a c
 Pityophthorus sampsoni Stebbing, E.P., 1914 c
 Pityophthorus sapineus Bright, 1981d c
 Pityophthorus scabridus Schedl, 1955g c
 Pityophthorus scalptor Blackman, 1928 i c
 Pityophthorus scalptus Bright, 1978 i c
 Pityophthorus schrenkianae Pjatnitskii, 1931 c
 Pityophthorus schwarzi Blackman, 1928 i c
 Pityophthorus schwerdtfegeri Wood & Bright, 1992 c
 Pityophthorus schwerdtfergeri (Schedl, 1955) i g
 Pityophthorus scitulus Wood, 1976a c
 Pityophthorus scriptor Blackman, 1921 i c
 Pityophthorus segnis Blackman, 1928 i c
 Pityophthorus seiryuensis Murayama, 1963c c
 Pityophthorus semiermis Nunberg, 1963c c
 Pityophthorus senex Wichmann, H.E., 1913d c
 Pityophthorus separatus Bright, 1977 i c
 Pityophthorus seriatus LeConte, 1878a c
 Pityophthorus serratus Swaine, 1918 i c
 Pityophthorus setifer Browne, 1965a c
 Pityophthorus setosus Blackman, 1928 i c
 Pityophthorus sextuberculatus Eggers, 1933b c
 Pityophthorus shannoni Blackman, 1942a c
 Pityophthorus shepardi Blackman, 1922c c
 Pityophthorus sibiricus Nunberg, 1956d c
 Pityophthorus sichotensis Kurenzov, 1941a c
 Pityophthorus sierrensis Bright, 1971 i c
 Pityophthorus signatifrons Browne, 1975a c
 Pityophthorus similaris Wood, 2007 c
 Pityophthorus similis Eichhoff, 1869a c
 Pityophthorus simplicis Wood, 2007 c
 Pityophthorus singularis Bright, 1966b c
 Pityophthorus sinopae Schedl, 1976a c
 Pityophthorus siouxensis Bright, 1977 c
 Pityophthorus smithi Schedl, 1931b c
 Pityophthorus sobrinus Wood, 1976a c
 Pityophthorus socius Blackman, 1928b c
 Pityophthorus solatus Wood, 1977b c
 Pityophthorus solers Blackman, 1928 i c
 Pityophthorus solus Blackman, 1928 i c
 Pityophthorus spadix Blackman, 1942a c
 Pityophthorus sparsepilosus Wood, 1975b c
 Pityophthorus speciosus Wood, 1977b c
 Pityophthorus speculum Bright, 1976c c
 Pityophthorus splendens Wood, 2007 c
 Pityophthorus strictus Wood, 1976a c
 Pityophthorus subconcentralis Schedl, 1938a c
 Pityophthorus subcribratus Schedl, 1937h c
 Pityophthorus subimpressus Bright, 1976c c
 Pityophthorus subopacus Blackman, 1942a c
 Pityophthorus subsimilans Wood, 1989 c
 Pityophthorus subsimilis Schedl, 1955g c
 Pityophthorus subsulcatus Wood & Bright, 1992 c
 Pityophthorus sulcatus Bright, 1977 i c
 Pityophthorus surinamensis Schedl, 1961i c
 Pityophthorus suspiciosus Bright, 1972d c
 Pityophthorus suturalis Eggers, 1932d c
 Pityophthorus swainei Blackman, 1928b c
 Pityophthorus temporarius Bright & Poinar, 1994 c
 Pityophthorus tenax Wood, 1976a c
 Pityophthorus tenuis Swaine, J.M., 1925b c
 Pityophthorus terebrans Schedl, 1970i c
 Pityophthorus thamnus Bright, 1985a c
 Pityophthorus thatcheri Bright, 1976c c
 Pityophthorus thomasi Bright, 1976c c
 Pityophthorus timidulus Wood, 1975b c
 Pityophthorus timidus Blandford, 1904 c
 Pityophthorus togonus Eggers, 1920 c
 Pityophthorus tomentosus Eichhoff, 1878b c
 Pityophthorus tonsus Blackman, 1928b c
 Pityophthorus toralis Wood, 1964 i c
 Pityophthorus torreyanae Swaine, J.M., 1918a c
 Pityophthorus torridus Wood, 1971 i c
 Pityophthorus traeghardhi Spessivtseff, 1921 g
 Pityophthorus tragardhi Spessivtsev, P., 1921a c
 Pityophthorus treculiae Schedl, 1962k c
 Pityophthorus trepidus Bright, 1978 i c
 Pityophthorus trunculus Bright, 1985a c
 Pityophthorus tuberculatus Eichhoff, 1878b c
 Pityophthorus tucumanensis Wood, 2007 c
 Pityophthorus tumidus Blackman, 1928 i c
 Pityophthorus turbiculus Schedl, 1938a c
 Pityophthorus tutulus Bright, 1986a c
 Pityophthorus varians Schedl, 1930 c
 Pityophthorus vegrandis Bright, 1986a c
 Pityophthorus venezuelensis Schedl, 1935d c
 Pityophthorus venustus Blackman, 1928 i c
 Pityophthorus vesculus Wood, 1978b c
 Pityophthorus vescus Wood, 2007 c
 Pityophthorus vespertinus Bright, 1978 c
 Pityophthorus viminalis Bright, 1977 c
 Pityophthorus virilis Blackman, 1928 i c
 Pityophthorus virtus Schedl, 1938a c
 Pityophthorus volvulus Schedl, 1965f c
 Pityophthorus vrydaghi Nunberg, 1973 c
 Pityophthorus watsoni Schedl, 1930 c
 Pityophthorus woodi Bright, 1977 i c
 Pityophthorus xylotrupes Eichhoff, 1872a c
 Pityophthorus zeteki Blackman, 1942a c
 Pityophthorus zexmenivora Bright, 1985a c
 Pityophthorus zonalis Bright, 1976 i c

Data sources: i = ITIS, c = Catalogue of Life, g = GBIF, b = Bugguide.net

References

Pityophthorus
Articles created by Qbugbot